Brienne-le-Château is a commune in the Aube department in north-central France.

History
It was the centre of the medieval County of Brienne, whose lords, first counts and eventually dukes, had a claim to the Kingdom of Jerusalem.  John of Brienne ( c. 1170 – 27 March 1237), also known as John I, was King of Jerusalem from 1210 to 1225 (and Latin Emperor of Constantinople from 1229 to 1237). He was the youngest son of Erard II of Brienne, a wealthy nobleman in Champagne.
 
The École de Brienne was established in 1730 and remained active until it was closed in 1790. It is currently a museum. Notable students included:
 Napoleon Bonaparte (1779 to 1784) (French Emperor)
 Władysław Franciszek Jabłonowski (1783) (Polish general)
 Louis-Nicolas Davout (French Marshal)
 Antoine Le Picard de Phélippeaux

In 1814, it was the site of the Battle of Brienne, when the Sixth Coalition invaded France.

Population

See also
 Communes of the Aube department
 Parc naturel régional de la Forêt d'Orient

References

References

External links

 Official site 

Communes of Aube
Palaces and residences of Napoleon
Aube communes articles needing translation from French Wikipedia